The Technical Sciences Academy of Romania was created on 17 October 1997, when its 27 founding members decided to revive the former Romanian Academy of Sciences, which had been disestablished in 1948, being merged into the Academy of the Romanian Popular Republic.

The Academy’s leadership do not publish financial declarations. The Academy does not produce annual reports and lacks a telephone number. Its 2019 budget was 3,886,000 lei.

Short history 

On 11 December 1997, by its court decision Nr. 1218 the Bucharest Tribunal registered the creation of the Academy and its bylaws.

On 11 December 1997, by its court decision Nr. 1218 the Bucharest Tribunal registered the creation of the Academy and its bylaws. The first bylaws of the Academy were drafted by Radu Voinea, Florin Teodor Tănăsescu, Mihai Mihăiță and Mircea Stelin Petrescu,
The Decision of the Romanian Government No. 807/21.06.2006, recognized ASTR as an organization of public utility.

In 2008, the Romanian Parliament discussed the functions of the Technical Sciences Academy of Romania, elevating it to national forum of scientific consecration of personalities in the field of engineering, of debates and initiatives for the promotion and development of research, technical creation and engineering education, by an appropriate change in the academy's purpose. The law was discussed and approved by the Chamber of Deputies of the Romanian Parliament on 8 October 2008, and was promulgated by the President of Romania on 30 October 2008.

Based on Law No. 230/2008, as well as on its previous bylaws and on the experience gained during 12 years of activity, new bylaws of the academy were drafted. The new bylaws were approved by the General Assembly of the Technical Sciences Academy of Romania on 23 June 2009. At the same time the new leadership of the academy was elected and the creation of the academy's branches and sections was approved.

In October 2006, ASTR became member of EURO – CASE European Council of Applied Sciences and Engineering.

Founding members 
The following scientists were the founding members of the Academy:
 Radu Voinea	
 Aurelian Stam
 Marius Sabin Peculea
 Mihai Gafițanu
 Gheorghe Buzdugan
 Virgiliu Nicolae Constantinescu
 Panaite Mazilu
 Alexandru Balaban
 Horia Colan
 Aureliu Leca
 Mircea Stelin Petrescu
 Mircea Ivănescu
 Dan Ghiocel
 Toma Dordea
 Vasile Cătuneanu
 Gheorghe Silas
 Adelaida Mateescu	 
 Ioan Toma Alexandru Stănculescu
 Șerban Gheorghe Raicu	
 Mihai Mihăiță
 Florin Teodor Tănăsescu	 
 Mircea Marinescu
 Tiberiu Dimitrie Babeu
 Dorel Zugrăvescu 
 Oliviu Rusu

Other members include Nicolae Pandrea, Nicolae Vasile and Michael Ghil.

Sections 
The activity of the academy takes places within the following section:

 Technical Mechanics
 Engineering Mechanics
 Electrotechnic and Energetic Engineering
 Electronics and Automatics
 Information and Communication Technology, Computers and Telecommunications
 Constructions and Urbanism
 Transportation Technology
 Chemical Engineering
 Materials Science and Engineering
 Petroleum and Mining Engineering, Geonomy

References

 

Technical Sciences Academy of Romania
National academies of sciences
National academies
1997 establishments in Romania
Scientific organizations established in 1997
Science and technology in Romania